The 1967 Boston Red Sox season was the 67th season in the franchise's Major League Baseball history. The Red Sox finished first in the American League (AL) with a record of 92 wins and 70 losses. The team then faced the National League champion St. Louis Cardinals in the 1967 World Series, which the Red Sox lost in seven games.

The regular season had one of the most memorable finishes in baseball history, as the AL pennant race went to the last game, with the Red Sox finishing one game ahead of both the Detroit Tigers and Minnesota Twins in the final AL standings. Red Sox left fielder Carl Yastrzemski won the Triple Crown, tying Harmon Killebrew for the AL lead in home runs (44) while leading the league in runs batted in (121) and batting average (.326).

Often referred to as "The Impossible Dream", this was the team's first winning season since 1958, as the Red Sox shocked all of New England and the rest of the baseball world by reaching the World Series for the first time since 1946.

Offseason

Notable transactions 
 November 29, 1966: 1966 minor league draft
Amos Otis was drafted from the Red Sox by the New York Mets.
Mike Page was drafted from the Red Sox by the Atlanta Braves.
 January 28, 1967: Geoff Zahn was drafted by the Red Sox in the 5th round of the 1967 Major League Baseball draft (Secondary Phase), but did not sign.
 Prior to 1967 season: Tony Muser was signed as an amateur free agent by the Red Sox.

Preseason: Low expectations 
The Red Sox entered the 1967 season as "doormats" of the American League, with low expectations, low attendance to begin the season, and little known talent outside of team captain Carl Yastrzemski. They had had losing seasons for each of the previous eight years. Two years earlier, the Red Sox had finished the 1965 season with 100 losses. In addition, the team posted ninth-place finishes in 1965 and 1966. Low expectations for the season were demonstrated by the measly 8,324 fans who attended Opening Day, which about matched their average attendance throughout the 1960s.

Regular season 
Boston historians consider the 1967 Red Sox season as the "re-invention" of Boston Red Sox baseball. Every aspect of Boston baseball was transformed at the hands of this club. For instance, in 1966, the Red Sox ranked eighth out of ten American League teams in home attendance (811,172). The 1967 season set a Fenway Park record and the Sox finished first in the league in home attendance (1,727,832). Jerry Remy (former Red Sox television broadcaster for NESN) is quoted as saying, "1967 created the Red Sox craze and Red Sox Nation we have today. They re-invented baseball in New England."

Major personnel moves 
In 1967, Dick Williams became the manager of the Red Sox. Previously, he had coached the Red Sox' farm club in Toronto. Williams was a stern disciplinarian and enacted a get tough policy. He stressed the fundamentals. In spring training, he had called George Scott "fat".

The Red Sox also made two major acquisitions down the stretch. The first came on August 3, when the Red Sox acquired catcher Elston Howard from the New York Yankees. Howard would hit just .147 while replacing Mike Ryan as the starting catcher, forcing the Red Sox to turn to third-stringer Russ Gibson more and more often down the stretch. While Gibson hit just .203, it was better than either Howard or Ryan (who hit .199) had managed during the season.  The acquisition was more about Howard's experience: the Red Sox had a very young team, and Howard was a good influence on their pitching staff. 
The second was on August 28, when they signed outfielder Ken Harrelson after the Kansas City Athletics released him. Harrelson replaced José Tartabull as the starting right fielder. Tartabull himself had replaced the injured Tony Conigliaro, who was out for the season after a brutal beaning, detailed below.

With the players on their roster averaging 25.4 years of age, the 1967 Red Sox were the second-youngest team in Major League Baseball that season; only the cellar-dwelling Athletics (24.8) were younger.

Setback: Tony Conigliaro 
Throughout the season of 1967, the Red Sox were clicking offensively and defensively right from Opening Day. One of the keys to the Red Sox instant success was young, fan-favorite Tony Conigliaro. Entering his fourth season in 1967, Conigliaro set the bar for his personal success very high, as he achieved immediate success his first three years in the major leagues. In fact, Conigliaro slugged an amazing 24 home runs his rookie season in 1964, followed by an AL leading 32 home runs his sophomore season in 1965 and 28 in 1966. As the Red Sox showed promise in the early part of the 1967 season, Conigliaro's expectations from the fans rose exponentially.

Throughout Conigliaro's first three seasons, minor and typical baseball injuries struck the young player. He had broken his left arm his rookie season, broken his left wrist his sophomore season after being hit by a pitch, and missed day-to-day action on other various minor injuries. Nothing serious had prevented Conigliaro from bouncing back and continuing to see offensive success at an unparalleled rapid pace. Some Red Sox die-hards in fact predicted Conigliaro would finish his career with better numbers than the great Ted Williams.

On August 18, 1967, in the fifth inning of a mid-summer game between Boston and the California Angels at Fenway Park, Conigliaro was beaned by a pitch from Angels pitcher Jack Hamilton right above the left cheek bone. Conigliaro was immediately knocked unconscious and was taken off the field on a stretcher.  It was later announced that the slugger had sustained severe damage to his cheek bone and the retina of his eye.  Conigliaro missed the remainder of the 1967 season and, as Boston held its breath for their young phenom, memories of the long drought of being a winning team in baseball had crept over the Fenway crowd. (No mentions of a curse, however. The idea of the "Curse of the Bambino" would not be entertained for another 20 years.)

Though their young All-Star was out indefinitely, the Red Sox won the game and continued on to win the American League Championship. However, faith from Red Sox fans had to be found without Conigliaro. He would return a year later, and earn Comeback Player of the Year Award in 1969. In 1970, he would reach career-high numbers in HRs (36) and RBI (116).  Problems with Conigliaro's eyesight returned in 1971 and he had to retire from major league baseball following a stint with the California Angels that year.  His eyesight improved to the point that he attempted—and briefly succeeded—in a comeback attempt with the Red Sox during the spring of 1975.  However following an early season injury he was replaced in the lineup by rookie and future Hall-of-Famer Jim Rice, and was released shortly thereafter, never to return to professional baseball.

Carl Yastrzemski 
During the "impossible dream" of 1967, Red Sox slugger and the 1963 batting champion, Carl Yastrzemski, led the Red Sox in his break-out season, transforming his young career and elevating himself from All-Star to Most Valuable Player. "Yaz" led the Red Sox in batting average, hits, home runs, runs batted in, on-base percentage, slugging percentage, on-base + slugging, games played, at bat appearances, runs scored, total bases, doubles, base on balls (walks) and extra base hits. He was also named to his fourth All-Star Game, which was the third straight year he received this honor.

All of these team categories in which he led the club were overshadowed by his accomplishments in offensive statistics league-wide. Yastrzemski batted .326 on the season, slugged 44 home runs, and drove in 121 RBIs, which led the American League in all three of these main offensive categories (Yastrzemski was actually tied in the home run category with Harmon Killebrew of the Minnesota Twins). In leading the league in home runs, RBIs, and batting average, Yastrzemski achieved the Triple Crown. Only one Red Sox player in history had reached this milestone—Ted Williams, who did it twice, in 1942 and 1947. It was the second consecutive year that the Triple Crown was achieved in the American League, Frank Robinson having won the honor in 1966 during his first year with the Baltimore Orioles. It took 45 years before another triple crown was won, by Miguel Cabrera of the Detroit Tigers in 2012. In the scope of this season that had begun with low expectations for the Boston Red Sox, the leadership and outstanding batting by Yastrzemski added to the "impossible" feeling that the season overall had overwhelmed the New England region.

Yastrzemski ended the season with numerous awards and honors: 1967 All-Star, 1967 Most Valuable Player, 1967 Outfield Gold Glove, 1967 Major League Player of the Year. Statistically, Yastrzemski dominated the American League, as he had his own team. He led the league in: batting average, runs batted in, home runs, runs, slugging percentage, on-base plus slugging, hits, on-base percentage, and total bases.

The setting 
Red Sox second baseman Mike Andrews says of the times: "This chaotic war was going on while we were playing baseball. To think that baseball could be meaningful to these wounded soldiers was unbelievable." Four Red Sox players—All-Stars Jim Lonborg and Tony Conigliaro, along with Dalton Jones and Bill Landis—were drafted for military service. The four served two-week stints in the military reserve.

Season summary

Early games 
As a 21-year-old rookie, Billy Rohr made his first start on April 14 at Yankee Stadium facing Whitey Ford. He was one strike away from a no-hitter when Elston Howard, who would join the Red Sox later that season, hit a soft single into right-center field. Yastrzemski had saved Rohr's no-hit bid earlier in the game when he made an over-the-shoulder running-away catch deep in left field off the bat of Tom Tresh. Following Howard's single, Rohr proceeded to retire the next batter for a 3–0 shutout. Four days later at Fenway Park, he beat the Yankees again, 6–1. Mel Stottlemyre was charged with the loss.  However Rohr only won one more major league game and was out of the majors after the 1968 season.

August 
Right out of the gate, the Red Sox showed contender capabilities and entering August, were only two and a half games behind the league-leading Chicago White Sox and were eight games over .500.  By month's end, the White Sox lost hold of first-place and on August 26, the Red Sox sat atop the American League at 72–56. A five-way race between the Red Sox, White Sox, Detroit Tigers, Minnesota Twins, and the California Angels developed for the American League pennant. The Angels slumped in early September to fall out of the race, and the White Sox slumped in the next to last week of the season.

Down the stretch 
Starting September—the last month of the season—the Red Sox sat atop of the American League, but were caught in a dog-fight with Chicago, Minnesota and Detroit. The four teams were separated by half a game and all jumped between first to fourth sporadically.  The pennant race was coming down to the last weekend of the season. Unfortunately for the White Sox, a three-game sweep at the hands of the Washington Senators left Chicago three games out of first place and the pennant scramble a three-team race. The Red Sox faced the Twins in a two-game series at Fenway Park on that last weekend. The Twins were in first place, ahead by one game over the Red Sox. To win the pennant, The Red Sox had to sweep the Twins while the Detroit Tigers, playing the California Angels, would have to lose at least one more game.

Carl Yastrzemski, vying for the triple crown, led the American League in batting average and RBI, and shared the home run lead with Harmon Killebrew of the Twins. Both players hit one home run in the series, so Yastrzemski won the triple crown. Yastrzemski went 7 for 8 with a home run and 6 RBI in the two-game series. In the last game of the season, 21-game winner Jim Lonborg got the start for the Red Sox vs. the Twins' 20-game winner Dean Chance. The Red Sox won the game 5–3 with a five-run sixth inning, and Lonborg finished the season with 22 victories. In Detroit, the Tigers won the first game of a double header vs. the Angels, and needed to win the second game to tie the Red Sox for first place. But their bullpen failed, and the Angels' Rick Reichardt hit a home run in an 8–5 Angel win. The Red Sox had won their first American League pennant in 21 years. Mayor of Boston John F. Collins declared October 3, the day before the start of the World Series, as "Boston Red Sox Day".

Aftermath 
Although the Red Sox did not complete the unbelievable task and lost to the St. Louis Cardinals in the 1967 World Series, the overachieving club is considered among the greatest Red Sox teams in club history. Beyond Yastrzemski completing one of the best single season offensive campaigns, Red Sox players dominated the American League across the board. Pitcher Jim Lonborg won the Cy Young Award. The two Sox All-Stars, joined by Tony Conigliaro and Rico Petrocelli, comprised the four Red Sox named to the American League All-Star team.

Season standings

Record vs. opponents

Opening Day lineup

Notable transactions
June 2, 1967: Don McMahon and minor leaguer Bob Snow were traded by the Red Sox to the Chicago White Sox for Jerry Adair.
June 4, 1967: Don Demeter and Tony Horton were traded by the Red Sox to the Cleveland Indians for Gary Bell.
 June 6, 1967: Mike Garman was drafted by the Red Sox in the 1st round (3rd pick) of the 1967 Major League Baseball draft. Player signed June 9, 1967.
 July 15, 1967: Norm Siebern was purchased by the Red Sox from the San Francisco Giants.
 August 3, 1967: Pete Magrini and a player to be named later were traded by the Red Sox to the New York Yankees for Elston Howard. The Red Sox completed the deal by sending Ron Klimkowski to the Yankees on August 8.

Roster

Game log

|- style="text-align:center;background-color:#bbffbb"
| 1 || April 12 || White Sox || 5–4 || Lonborg (1–0) || Buzhardt (0–1) || McMahon (1) || 8,324 || 1–0
|- style="text-align:center;background-color:#ffbbbb"
| 2 || April 13 || White Sox || 8–5 || Lamabe (1–0) || Fischer (0–1) || Locker (1) || 3,607 || 1–1
|- style="text-align:center;background-color:#bbffbb"
| 3 || April 14 || @ Yankees || 3–0 || Rohr (1–0) || Ford (0–1) || || 14,375 || 2–1
|- style="text-align:center;background-color:#ffbbbb"
| 4 || April 15 || @ Yankees || 1–0 || Stottlemyre (2–0) || Bennett (0–1) || || 12,035 || 2–2
|- style="text-align:center;background-color:#ffbbbb"
| 5 || April 16 || @ Yankees || 7 – 6  || Downing (1–0) || Stange (0–1) || || 19,290 || 2–3
|- style="text-align:center;background-color:#ffbbbb"
| 6 || April 18 || @ White Sox || 5–2 || Howard (1–0) || Brandon (0–1) || || 1,313 || 2–4
|- style="text-align:center;background-color:#bbffbb"
| 7 || April 21 || Yankees || 6–1 || Rohr (2–0) || Stottlemyre (2–1) || || 25,603 || 3–4
|- style="text-align:center;background-color:#bbffbb"
| 8 || April 22 || Yankees || 5–4 || Santiago (1–0) || Womack (0–1) || McMahon (2) || 8,189 || 4–4
|- style="text-align:center;background-color:#ffbbbb"
| 9 || April 23 || Yankees || 7–5 || Downing (2–0) || Santiago (1–1) || || 18,041 || 4–5
|- style="text-align:center;background-color:#bbffbb"
| 10 || April 24 || @ Senators || 7–4 || Wyatt (1–0) || Lines (0–1) || || 2,235 || 5–5
|- style="text-align:center;background-color:#bbffbb"
| 11 || April 25 || @ Senators || 9–3 || Fischer (1–1) || Richert (0–3) || || 3,367 || 6–5
|- style="text-align:center;background-color:#bbffbb"
| 12 || April 28 || Athletics || 3–0 || Lonborg (2–0) || Hunter (2–1) || || 9,026 || 7–5
|- style="text-align:center;background-color:#bbffbb"
| 13 || April 29 || Athletics || 11 – 10  || McMahon (1–0) || Aker (2–1) || || 9,724 || 8–5
|- style="text-align:center;background-color:#ffbbbb"
| 14 || April 30 || Athletics || 1–0 || Nash (2–2) || Brandon (0–2) || || 31,450 || 8–6

|- style="text-align:center;background-color:#bbffbb"
| 15 || May 1 || @ Angels || 4–0 || Bennett (1–1) || Rubio (0–2) || || 8,956 || 9–6
|- style="text-align:center;background-color:#ffbbbb"
| 16 || May 2 || @ Angels || 3–2 || McGlothlin (1–0) || Fischer (1–2) || || 8,167 || 9–7
|- style="text-align:center;background-color:#ffbbbb"
| 17 || May 3 || @ Angels || 2–1 || Kelso (2–0) || Lonborg (2–1) || || 8,880 || 9–8
|- style="text-align:center;background-color:#ffbbbb"
| 18 || May 5 || @ Twins || 5–2 || Grant (1–3) || Rohr (2–1) || Worthington (3) || 9,893 || 9–9
|- style="text-align:center;background-color:#ffbbbb"
| 19 || May 6 || @ Twins || 4–2 || Chance (4–1) || Brandon (0–3) || || 11,595 || 9–10
|- style="text-align:center;background-color:#bbffbb"
| 20 || May 7 || @ Twins || 9–6 || Osinski (1–0) || Perry (0–2) || Wyatt (1) || 11,864 || 10–10
|- style="text-align:center;background-color:#ffbbbb"
| 21 || May 9 || @ Athletics || 4–3 || Krausse (1–4) || McMahon (1–1) || Aker (4) || || 10–11
|- style="text-align:center;background-color:#bbffbb"
| 22 || May 9 || @ Athletics || 5–2 || Wyatt (2–0) || Aker (2–2) || Osinski (1) || 7,708 || 11–11
|- style="text-align:center;background-color:#ffbbbb"
| 23 || May 10 || @ Athletics || 7–4 || Lindblad (1–0) || Stange (0–2) || || 4,996 || 11–12
|- style="text-align:center;background-color:#ffbbbb"
| 24 || May 12 || Tigers || 5–4 || Wilson (4–2) || Brandon (0–4) || Gladding (5) || 15,564 || 11–13
|- style="text-align:center;background-color:#ffbbbb"
| 25 || May 13 || Tigers || 10–8 || Korince (1–0) || Wyatt (2–1) || Wickersham (2) || 9,606 || 11–14
|- style="text-align:center;background-color:#bbffbb"
| 26 || May 14 || Tigers || 8–5 || Lonborg (3–1) || McLain (3–4) || Fischer (1) || || 12–14
|- style="text-align:center;background-color:#bbffbb"
| 27 || May 14 || Tigers || 13–9 || Santiago (2–1) || Lolich (4–2) || Cisco (1) || 16,436 || 13–14
|- style="text-align:center;background-color:#ffbbbb"
| 28 || May 16 || Orioles || 8–5 || Fisher (2–1) || Wyatt (2–2) || Miller (4) || 9,510 || 13–15
|- style="text-align:center;background-color:#ffbbbb"
| 29 || May 17 || Orioles || 12–8 || Dillman (2–0) || Cisco (0–1) || Drabowsky (2) || 8,714 || 13–16
|- style="text-align:center;background-color:#bbffbb"
| 30 || May 19 || Indians || 3–2 || Lonborg (4–1) || Bell (1–3) || || 15,534 || 14–16
|- style="text-align:center;background-color:#ffbbbb"
| 31 || May 20 || Indians || 5 – 3  || Bailey (1–0) || McMahon (1–2) || || 8,994 || 14–17
|- style="text-align:center;background-color:#bbffbb"
| 32 || May 21 || Indians || 4–3 || Wyatt (3–2) || Siebert (3–3) || Stange (1) || || 15–17
|- style="text-align:center;background-color:#bbffbb"
| 33 || May 21 || Indians || 6–2 || Brandon (1–4) || McDowell (2–2) || || 24,976 || 16–17
|- style="text-align:center;background-color:#bbffbb"
| 34 || May 23 || @ Tigers || 5–2 || Bennett (2–1) || Lolich (5–3) || Wyatt (2) || 7,570 || 17–17
|- style="text-align:center;background-color:#bbffbb"
| 35 || May 24 || @ Tigers || 1–0 || Lonborg (5–1) || McLain (4–5) || || 9,890 || 18–17
|- style="text-align:center;background-color:#ffbbbb"
| 36 || May 25 || @ Tigers || 9–3 || Wilson (6–3) || Santiago (2–2) || || 8,782 || 18–18
|- style="text-align:center;background-color:#ffbbbb"
| 37 || May 26 || @ Orioles || 4–3 || Drabowsky (3–0) || Rohr (2–2) || || 13,786 || 18–19
|- style="text-align:center;background-color:#ffbbbb"
| 38 || May 27 || @ Orioles || 10–0 || Phoebus (3–1) || Brandon (1–5) || || 26,488 || 18–20
|- style="text-align:center;background-color:#bbffbb"
| 39 || May 28 || @ Orioles || 4–3 || Lonborg (6–1) || Barber (3–5) || Wyatt (3) || 14,071 || 19–20
|- style="text-align:center;background-color:#bbffbb"
| 40 || May 30 || Angels || 5–4 || Osinski (2–0) || Kelso (2–1) || Wyatt (4) || || 20–20
|- style="text-align:center;background-color:#bbffbb"
| 41 || May 30 || Angels || 6–1 || Bennett (3–1) || Brunet (1–8) || || 32,012 || 21–20
|- style="text-align:center;background-color:#bbffbb"
| 42 || May 31 || Twins || 3–2 || Brandon (2–5) || Perry (0–3) || Wyatt (5) || 12,335 || 22–20

|- style="text-align:center;background-color:#ffbbbb"
| 43 || June 1 || Twins || 4–0 || Chance (9–2) || Rohr (2–3) || || 12,233 || 22–21
|- style="text-align:center;background-color:#bbffbb"
| 44 || June 2 || @ Indians || 2–1 || Lonborg (7–1) || Siebert (4–4) || || 8,809 || 23–21
|- style="text-align:center;background-color:#bbffbb"
| 45 || June 3 || @ Indians || 6–2 || Bennett (4–1) || Bell (1–5) || Santiago (1) || 5,816 || 24–21
|- style="text-align:center;background-color:#ffbbbb"
| 46 || June 4 || @ Indians || 3–0 || Hargan (7–4) || Stange (0–3) || || 27,395 || 24–22
|- style="text-align:center;background-color:#ffbbbb"
| 47 || June 6 || @ White Sox || 5–3 || Wilhelm (3–1) || Brandon (2–6) || Wood (1) || 10,463 || 24–23
|- style="text-align:center;background-color:#ffbbbb"
| 48 || June 8 || @ White Sox || 5–2 || Horlen (7–0) || Bennett (4–2) || || || 24–24
|- style="text-align:center;background-color:#bbffbb"
| 49 || June 8 || @ White Sox || 7–3 || Bell (2–5) || Howard (1–4) || || 4,748 || 25–24
|- style="text-align:center;background-color:#bbffbb"
| 50 || June 9 || Senators || 8–7 || Santiago (3–2) || Humphreys (1–1) || Wyatt (6) || 25,326 || 26–24
|- style="text-align:center;background-color:#ffbbbb"
| 51 || June 10 || Senators || 7–3 || Pascual (6–3) || Stange (0–4) || Baldwin (5) || 15,634 || 26–25
|- style="text-align:center;background-color:#bbffbb"
| 52 || June 11 || Senators || 4–3 || Santiago (4–2) || Baldwin (0–1) || Wyatt (7) || || 27–25
|- style="text-align:center;background-color:#ffbbbb"
| 53 || June 11 || Senators || 8–7 || Cox (1–0) || Osinski (2–1) || Priddy (2) || 16,599 || 27–26
|- style="text-align:center;background-color:#bbffbb"
| 54 || June 12 || Yankees || 3–1 || Bell (3–5) || Verbanic (2–1) || || 18,939 || 28–26
|- style="text-align:center;background-color:#ffbbbb"
| 55 || June 13 || Yankees || 5–3 || Talbot (3–2) || Lonborg (7–2) || Womack (5) || 17,190 || 28–27
|- style="text-align:center;background-color:#ffbbbb"
| 56 || June 14 || White Sox || 8–7 || Peters (8–3) || Bennett (4–3) || Wood (3) || || 28–28
|- style="text-align:center;background-color:#bbffbb"
| 57 || June 14 || White Sox || 6–1 || Stange (1–4) || Klages (0–1) || Santiago (2) || 22,178 || 29–28
|- style="text-align:center;background-color:#bbffbb"
| 58 || June 15 || White Sox || 2 – 1  || Wyatt (4–2) || Buzhardt (2–6) || || 16,775 || 30–28
|- style="text-align:center;background-color:#ffbbbb"
| 59 || June 16 || @ Senators || 1–0 || Priddy (1–3) || Bell (3–6) || Baldwin (6) || || 30–29
|- style="text-align:center;background-color:#ffbbbb"
| 60 || June 16 || @ Senators || 4–3 || Cox (2–0) || Wyatt (4–3) || || 8,820 || 30–30
|- style="text-align:center;background-color:#bbffbb"
| 61 || June 17 || @ Senators || 5–1 || Lonborg (8–2) || Moore (3–4) || || 3,944 || 31–30
|- style="text-align:center;background-color:#ffbbbb"
| 62 || June 18 || @ Senators || 3 – 2  || Knowles (4–5) || Santiago (4–3) || || 28,776 || 31–31
|- style="text-align:center;background-color:#bbffbb"
| 63 || June 20 || @ Yankees || 7–1 || Bell (4–6) || Stottlemyre (6–7) || || 8,739 || 32–31
|- style="text-align:center;background-color:#bbffbb"
| 64 || June 21 || @ Yankees || 8–1 || Lonborg (9–2) || Tillotson (3–3) || || 13,061 || 33–31
|- style="text-align:center;background-color:#bbffbb"
| 65 || June 23 || Indians || 8–4 || Stange (2–4) || Siebert (6–7) || || 30,233 || 34–31
|- style="text-align:center;background-color:#ffbbbb"
| 66 || June 24 || Indians || 3–2 || Hargan (9–6) || Brandon (2–7) || || 30,027 || 34–32
|- style="text-align:center;background-color:#bbffbb"
| 67 || June 25 || Indians || 8–3 || Bell (5–6) || Tiant (6–2) || Santiago (3) || 23,719 || 35–32
|- style="text-align:center;background-color:#ffbbbb"
| 68 || June 26 || @ Twins || 2–1 || Kaat (5–8) || Lonborg (9–3) || Worthington (10) || 13,701 || 35–33
|- style="text-align:center;background-color:#bbffbb"
| 69 || June 27 || @ Twins || 3–2 || Waslewski (1–0) || Chance (10–6) || Wyatt (8) || 18,711 || 36–33
|- style="text-align:center;background-color:#ffbbbb"
| 70 || June 28 || @ Twins || 3–2 || Boswell (5–5) || Stange (2–5) || || 11,940 || 36–34
|- style="text-align:center;background-color:#bbffbb"
| 71 || June 30 || @ Athletics || 5–3 || Bell (6–6) || Nash (8–7) || Wyatt (9) || 8,629 || 37–34

|- style="text-align:center;background-color:#bbffbb"
| 72 || July 1 || @ Athletics || 10–2 || Lonborg (10–3) || Dobson (4–5) || Santiago (4) || 12,951 || 38–34
|- style="text-align:center;background-color:#bbffbb"
| 73 || July 2 || @ Athletics || 2–1 || Waslewski (2–0) || Hunter (8–6) || Wyatt (10) || 9,264 || 39–34
|- style="text-align:center;background-color:#bbffbb"
| 74 || July 3 || @ Angels || 9–3 || Stange (3–5) || Hamilton (1–1) || || 17,005 || 40–34
|- style="text-align:center;background-color:#ffbbbb"
| 75 || July 4 || @ Angels || 4–3 || Clark (6–6) || Bell (6–7) || Rojas (13) || 39,673 || 40–35
|- style="text-align:center;background-color:#ffbbbb"
| 76 || July 5 || @ Angels || 4–3 || Brunet (6–11) || Santiago (4–4) || || 12,080 || 40–36
|- style="text-align:center;background-color:#ffbbbb"
| 77 || July 7 || @ Tigers || 5 – 4  || Marshall (1–1) || Wyatt (4–4) || || 27,213 || 40–37
|- style="text-align:center;background-color:#ffbbbb"
| 78 || July 8 || @ Tigers || 2–0 || McLain (10–9) || Stange (3–6) || || 19,481 || 40–38
|- style="text-align:center;background-color:#ffbbbb"
| 79 || July 9 || @ Tigers || 10–4 || Wilson (10–7) || Bell (6–8) || Marshall (4) || || 40–39
|- style="text-align:center;background-color:#bbffbb"
| 80 || July 9 || @ Tigers || 3–0 || Lonborg (11–3) || Wickersham (4–2) || Wyatt (11) || 48,266 || 41–39
|- style="text-align:center;background-color:#bbffbb"
| 81 || July 13 || Orioles || 4–2 || Stange (4–6) || Phoebus (7–4) || Wyatt (12) || 19,171 || 42–39
|- style="text-align:center;background-color:#ffbbbb"
| 82 || July 13 || Orioles || 10–0 || McNally (6–5) || Bell (6–9) || || 23,111 || 42–40
|- style="text-align:center;background-color:#bbffbb"
| 83 || July 14 || Orioles || 11–5 || Lonborg (12–3) || Adamson (0–1) || Wyatt (13) || 27,787 || 43–40
|- style="text-align:center;background-color:#bbffbb"
| 84 || July 15 || Orioles || 5–1 || Santiago (5–4) || Richert (5–10) || Bell (1) || 16,025 || 44–40
|- style="text-align:center;background-color:#bbffbb"
| 85 || July 16 || Tigers || 9–5 || Brandon (3–7) || Sparma (9–3) || Lyle (1) || 28,237 || 45–40
|- style="text-align:center;background-color:#bbffbb"
| 86 || July 17 || Tigers || 7–1 || Stange (5–6) || McLain (10–11) || || 28,991 || 46–40
|- style="text-align:center;background-color:#bbffbb"
| 87 || July 18 || @ Orioles || 6–2 || Lonborg (13–3) || McNally (6–6) || || 14,409 || 47–40
|- style="text-align:center;background-color:#bbffbb"
| 88 || July 19 || @ Orioles || 6–4 || Santiago (6–4) || Richert (6–11) || || 12,154 || 48–40
|- style="text-align:center;background-color:#bbffbb"
| 89 || July 21 || @ Indians || 6–2 || Brandon (4–7) || Tiant (7–5) || || 10,893 || 49–40
|- style="text-align:center;background-color:#bbffbb"
| 90 || July 22 || @ Indians || 4–0 || Stange (6–6) || Hargan (9–8) || || 7,990 || 50–40
|- style="text-align:center;background-color:#bbffbb"
| 91 || July 23 || @ Indians || 8–5 || Lonborg (14–3) || O'Donoghue (5–3) || || || 51–40
|- style="text-align:center;background-color:#bbffbb"
| 92 || July 23 || @ Indians || 5–1 || Bell (7–9) || Tiant (7–6) || || 13,786 || 52–40
|- style="text-align:center;background-color:#ffbbbb"
| 93 || July 25 || Angels || 6–4 || Newman (1–0) || Waslewski (2–1) || || 21,527 || 52–41
|- style="text-align:center;background-color:#bbffbb"
| 94 || July 26 || Angels || 9–6 || Landis (1–0) || Rojas (7–6) || Wyatt (14) || 32,403 || 53–41
|- style="text-align:center;background-color:#bbffbb"
| 95 || July 27 || Angels || 6 – 5  || Lyle (1–0) || Kelso (4–3) || || 34,193 || 54–41
|- style="text-align:center;background-color:#ffbbbb"
| 96 || July 28 || Twins || 9–2 || Chance (12–8) || Lonborg (14–4) || || 33,075 || 54–42
|- style="text-align:center;background-color:#bbffbb"
| 97 || July 29 || Twins || 6–3 || Wyatt (5–4) || Worthington (6–6) || Santiago (5) || || 55–42
|- style="text-align:center;background-color:#ffbbbb"
| 98 || July 29 || Twins || 10–3 || Perry (3–5) || Waslewski (2–2) || || 35,469 || 55–43
|- style="text-align:center;background-color:#ffbbbb"
| 99 || July 30 || Twins || 7–5 || Merritt (7–3) || Brandon (4–8) || Roland (2) || 24,459 || 55–44
|- style="text-align:center;background-color:#bbffbb"
| 100 || July 31 || Twins || 4–0 || Stange (7–6) || Boswell (8–8) || || 22,605 || 56–44

|- style="text-align:center;background-color:#ffbbbb"
| 101 || August 1 || Athletics || 4–3 || Dobson (7–6) || Morehead (0–1) || || || 56–45
|- style="text-align:center;background-color:#bbffbb"
| 102 || August 1 || Athletics || 8–3 || Lonborg (15–4) || Sanford (4–4) || Lyle (2) || 26,750 || 57–45
|- style="text-align:center;background-color:#ffbbbb"
| 103 || August 2 || Athletics || 8–6 || Segui (2–3) || Wyatt (5–5) || Krausse (2) || 24,581 || 57–46
|- style="text-align:center;background-color:#bbffbb"
| 104 || August 3 || Athletics || 5–3 || Morehead (1–1) || Hunter (9–11) || Wyatt (15) || 18,920 || 58–46
|- style="text-align:center;background-color:#ffbbbb"
| 105 || August 4 || @ Twins || 3–0 || Merritt (8–3) || Brandon (4–9) || || 31,645 || 58–47
|- style="text-align:center;background-color:#ffbbbb"
| 106 || August 5 || @ Twins || 2–1 || Boswell (9–8) || Stange (7–7) || || 26,003 || 58–48
|- style="text-align:center;background-color:#ffbbbb"
| 107 || August 6 || @ Twins || 2 – 0  || Chance (14–8) || Lonborg (15–5) || || 26,003 || 58–49
|- style="text-align:center;background-color:#ffbbbb"
| 108 || August 7 || @ Athletics || 5–3 || Hunter (10–11) || Morehead (1–2) || Aker (12) || || 58–50
|- style="text-align:center;background-color:#bbffbb"
| 109 || August 8 || @ Athletics || 7–5 || Wyatt (6–5) || Stafford (0–1) || Brandon (1) || 13,125 || 59–50
|- style="text-align:center;background-color:#bbffbb"
| 110 || August 9 || @ Athletics || 5–1 || Lonborg (16–5) || Nash (10–11) || Lyle (3) || 7,313 || 60–50
|- style="text-align:center;background-color:#ffbbbb"
| 111 || August 11 || @ Angels || 1–0 || McGlothlin (10–4) || Stange (7–8) || || 26,773 || 60–51
|- style="text-align:center;background-color:#ffbbbb"
| 112 || August 12 || @ Angels || 2–1 || Hamilton (6–2) || Bell (7–10) || Rojas (21) || 32,821 || 60–52
|- style="text-align:center;background-color:#ffbbbb"
| 113 || August 13 || @ Angels || 3–2 || Clark (9–8) || Lonborg (16–6) || Kelso (9) || 22,008 || 60–53
|- style="text-align:center;background-color:#bbffbb"
| 114 || August 15 || Tigers || 4–0 || Morehead (2–2) || Sparma (12–5) || || 27,125 || 61–53
|- style="text-align:center;background-color:#bbffbb"
| 115 || August 16 || Tigers || 8–3 || Brandon (5–9) || McLain (15–13) || || 32,051 || 62–53
|- style="text-align:center;background-color:#ffbbbb"
| 116 || August 17 || Tigers || 7 – 4  || Gladding (4–4) || Lyle (1–1) || || 28,653 || 62–54
|- style="text-align:center;background-color:#bbffbb"
| 117 || August 18 || Angels || 3–2 || Bell (8–10) || Hamilton (6–3) || || 31,027 || 63–54
|- style="text-align:center;background-color:#bbffbb"
| 118 || August 19 || Angels || 12–11 || Osinski (3–1) || Coates (0–2) || Stephenson (1) || 24,117 || 64–54
|- style="text-align:center;background-color:#bbffbb"
| 119 || August 20 || Angels || 12–2 || Stange (8–8) || Brunet (11–15) || || || 65–54
|- style="text-align:center;background-color:#bbffbb"
| 120 || August 20 || Angels || 9–8 || Santiago (7–4) || Rojas (9–8) || || 33,840 || 66–54
|- style="text-align:center;background-color:#bbffbb"
| 121 || August 21 || Senators || 6–5 || Wyatt (7–5) || Knowles (5–7) || || 26,018 || 67–54
|- style="text-align:center;background-color:#bbffbb"
| 122 || August 22 || Senators || 2–1 || Stephenson (1–0) || Ortega (9–6) || Wyatt (16) || || 68–54
|- style="text-align:center;background-color:#bbffbb"
| 123 || August 22 || Senators || 5–3 || Bell (9–10) || Cox (6–2) || Brandon (2) || 30,994 || 69–54
|- style="text-align:center;background-color:#ffbbbb"
| 124 || August 23 || Senators || 3–2 || Priddy (2–5) || Lyle (1–2) || || 33,680 || 69–55
|- style="text-align:center;background-color:#bbffbb"
| 125 || August 24 || Senators || 7–5 || Morehead (3–2) || Nold (0–2) || Wyatt (17) || 31,283 || 70–55
|- style="text-align:center;background-color:#bbffbb"
| 126 || August 25 || @ White Sox || 7–1 || Lonborg (17–6) || Peters (14–7) || || || 71–55
|- style="text-align:center;background-color:#ffbbbb"
| 127 || August 25 || @ White Sox || 2–1 || Locker (6–3) || Wyatt (7–6) || || 34,580 || 71–56
|- style="text-align:center;background-color:#bbffbb"
| 128 || August 26 || @ White Sox || 6–2 || Stephenson (2–0) || Horlen (14–5) || Brandon (3) || 12,391 || 72–56
|- style="text-align:center;background-color:#bbffbb"
| 129 || August 27 || @ White Sox || 4–3 || Bell (10–10) || Klages (2–3) || Wyatt (18) || || 73–56
|- style="text-align:center;background-color:#ffbbbb"
| 130 || August 27 || @ White Sox || 1 – 0  || Peters (15–7) || Brandon (5–10) || || 22,352 || 73–57
|- style="text-align:center;background-color:#bbffbb"
| 131 || August 28 || @ Yankees || 3–0 || Morehead (4–2) || Talbot (5–7) || Lyle (4) || 27,296 || 74–57
|- style="text-align:center;background-color:#bbffbb"
| 132 || August 29 || @ Yankees || 2–1 || Lonborg (18–6) || Stottlemyre (13–11) || || || 75–57
|- style="text-align:center;background-color:#ffbbbb"
| 133 || August 29 || @ Yankees || 4 – 3  || Bouton (1–0) || Brandon (5–11) || || 40,314 || 75–58
|- style="text-align:center;background-color:#bbffbb"
| 134 || August 30 || @ Yankees || 2 – 1  || Wyatt (8–6) || Downing (12–8) || || 22,766 || 76–58
|- style="text-align:center;background-color:#ffbbbb"
| 135 || August 31 || White Sox || 4–2 || McMahon (4–2) || Bell (10–11) || || 35,138 || 76–59

|- style="text-align:center;background-color:#bbffbb"
| 136 || September 1 || White Sox || 10–2 || Santiago (8–4) || Peters (15–8) || || 34,054 || 77–59
|- style="text-align:center;background-color:#ffbbbb"
| 137 || September 2 || White Sox || 4–1 || Horlen (15–6) || Lonborg (18–7) || || 28,222 || 77–60
|- style="text-align:center;background-color:#ffbbbb"
| 138 || September 3 || White Sox || 4–0 || John (9–9) || Stange (8–9) || || 29,818 || 77–61
|- style="text-align:center;background-color:#ffbbbb"
| 139 || September 4 || @ Senators || 5–2 || Pascual (12–10) || Morehead (4–3) || Knowles (12) || || 77–62
|- style="text-align:center;background-color:#bbffbb"
| 140 || September 4 || @ Senators || 6–4 || Stephenson (3–0) || Lines (1–5) || Wyatt (19) || 32,355 || 78–62
|- style="text-align:center;background-color:#bbffbb"
| 141 || September 5 || @ Senators || 8–2 || Bell (11–11) || Bertaina (4–5) || || 9,093 || 79–62
|- style="text-align:center;background-color:#bbffbb"
| 142 || September 7 || Yankees || 3–1 || Lonborg (19–7) || Stottlemyre (14–12) || || 28,738 || 80–62
|- style="text-align:center;background-color:#ffbbbb"
| 143 || September 8 || Yankees || 5–2 || Monbouquette (4–4) || Stange (8–10) || Verbanic (2) || 33,534 || 80–63
|- style="text-align:center;background-color:#bbffbb"
| 144 || September 9 || Yankees || 7–1 || Morehead (5–3) || Barber (9–16) || Lyle (5) || 32,119 || 81–63
|- style="text-align:center;background-color:#bbffbb"
| 145 || September 10 || Yankees || 9–1 || Bell (12–11) || Downing (13–9) || || 26,341 || 82–63
|- style="text-align:center;background-color:#bbffbb"
| 146 || September 12 || Athletics || 3–1 || Lonborg (20–7) || Hunter (11–15) || || 27,976 || 83–63
|- style="text-align:center;background-color:#bbffbb"
| 147 || September 13 || Athletics || 4–2 || Wyatt (9–6) || Aker (3–8) || || 12,257 || 84–63
|- style="text-align:center;background-color:#ffbbbb"
| 148 || September 15 || Orioles || 6–2 || Phoebus (13–8) || Morehead (5–4) || Drabowsky (11) || 32,489 || 84–64
|- style="text-align:center;background-color:#ffbbbb"
| 149 || September 16 || Orioles || 4–1 || Hardin (7–2) || Lonborg (20–8) || || 27,219 || 84–65
|- style="text-align:center;background-color:#ffbbbb"
| 150 || September 17 || Orioles || 5–2 || Brabender (5–4) || Bell (12–12) || Miller (8) || 30,301 || 84–66
|- style="text-align:center;background-color:#bbffbb"
| 151 || September 18 || @ Tigers || 6 – 5  || Santiago (9–4) || Marshall (1–3) || || 42,674 || 85–66
|- style="text-align:center;background-color:#bbffbb"
| 152 || September 19 || @ Tigers || 4–2 || Santiago (10–4) || Lolich (11–13) || Bell (2) || 43,004 || 86–66
|- style="text-align:center;background-color:#bbffbb"
| 153 || September 20 || @ Indians || 5–4 || Wyatt (10–6) || Culver (7–3) || || 6,603 || 87–66
|- style="text-align:center;background-color:#bbffbb"
| 154 || September 21 || @ Indians || 6–5 || Bell (13–12) || Hargan (14–13) || Wyatt (20) || 4,492 || 88–66
|- style="text-align:center;background-color:#ffbbbb"
| 155 || September 22 || @ Orioles || 10–0 || Hardin (8–2) || Stephenson (3–1) || || || 88–67
|- style="text-align:center;background-color:#bbffbb"
| 156 || September 22 || @ Orioles || 10–3 || Santiago (11–4) || Richert (9–16) || || 14,714 || 89–67
|- style="text-align:center;background-color:#ffbbbb"
| 157 || September 23 || @ Orioles || 7–5 || Miller (3–10) || Wyatt (10–7) || || 10,251 || 89–68
|- style="text-align:center;background-color:#bbffbb"
| 158 || September 24 || @ Orioles || 11–7 || Lonborg (21–8) || Phoebus (14–9) || Osinski (2) || 5,609 || 90–68
|- style="text-align:center;background-color:#ffbbbb"
| 159 || September 26 || Indians || 6–3 || Tiant (12–9) || Bell (13–13) || || 16,652 || 90–69
|- style="text-align:center;background-color:#ffbbbb"
| 160 || September 27 || Indians || 6–0 || Siebert (10–12) || Lonborg (21–9) || Williams (1) || 18,415 || 90–70
|- style="text-align:center;background-color:#bbffbb"
| 161 || September 30 || Twins || 6–4 || Santiago (12–4) || Kline (7–1) || Bell (3) || 32,909 || 91–70

|- style="text-align:center;background-color:#bbffbb"
| 162 || October 1 || Twins || 5–3 || Lonborg (22–9) || Chance (20–14) || || 35,770 || 92–70

Player stats

Batting

Starters by position
Note: Pos = Position; G = Games played; AB = At bats; H = Hits; Avg. = Batting average; HR = Home runs; RBI = Runs batted in

Other batters
Note: G = Games played; AB = At bats; H = Hits; Avg. = Batting average; HR = Home runs; RBI = Runs batted in

Pitching

Starting pitchers
Note: G = Games pitched; IP = Innings pitched; W = Wins; L = Losses; ERA = Earned run average; SO = Strikeouts

Other pitchers
Note: G = Games pitched; IP = Innings pitched; W = Wins; L = Losses; ERA = Earned run average; SO = Strikeouts

Relief pitchers
Note: G = Games pitched; W = Wins; L = Losses; SV = Saves; ERA = Earned run average; SO = Strikeouts

1967 World Series

Awards and honors

Individual awards and leaders 
 American League Most Valuable Player: Carl Yastrzemski
 American League Cy Young Award: Jim Lonborg
 American League Gold Glove Awards: George Scott (first base), Carl Yastrzemski (outfield)
 American League Batting Champion: Carl Yastrzemski (.326)
 American League Home Run Champion: Carl Yastrzemski (44)
 American League RBI Leader: Carl Yastrzemski (121)
 American League All-Stars: Carl Yastrzemski, Rico Petrocelli, Tony Conigliaro, Jim Lonborg
 Associated Press Athlete of the Year: Carl Yastrzemski
 Associated Press AL Manager of the Year: Dick Williams
 Hutch Award: Carl Yastrzemski

Team statistics 
 Batting average: 1st (.255)
 Runs/game: 1st (4.46)
 Hits: 1st (1394)
 Home Runs: 1st (158)

Commemoration 
The 2007 season marked the 40th anniversary of The Impossible Dream, which was honored and marked with Opening Day ceremonies featuring members of the 1967 Red Sox team and an hour-long documentary on NESN (a regional sports network part-owned by the Red Sox) called Impossible to Forget. The Red Sox went on to win the 2007 World Series, a four-game sweep over the Colorado Rockies as well, to earn their second title in four years.

Farm system

Source:

References

Further reading

External links
1967 Boston Red Sox at Baseball Reference
1967 Boston Red Sox season at Baseball Almanac

Boston Red Sox seasons
Boston Red Sox
Boston Red Sox
1960s in Boston
American League champion seasons